The following is a list of notable software for running a BitTorrent tracker.

References 

BitTorrent
BitTorrent tracker software
File sharing software